The Farmer from Texas is a 1925 German silent comedy film directed by Joe May and starring Mady Christians, Willy Fritsch, and Lillian Hall-Davis. It was based on the play Kolportage by Georg Kaiser. The film was considered a costly box office failure, contributing to a financial crisis at Germany's largest studio Universum Film AG. The film's sets were designed by Paul Leni.

Cast

References

Bibliography

External links

1925 films
Films of the Weimar Republic
German silent feature films
1925 comedy films
German comedy films
Films directed by Joe May
German films based on plays
UFA GmbH films
Films based on works by Georg Kaiser
Films produced by Joe May
Films with screenplays by Joe May
German black-and-white films
Silent comedy films
1920s German films
1920s German-language films